Nicholas Bobadilla, SJ (1511 – 23 September 1590) was one of the first Jesuits.

Biography

He was born in Palencia, Spain, and was educated in his own country and in France. He fell under the influence of Ignatius of Loyola while studying at the University of Paris, and became one of the first Jesuits.

Bobadilla was an effective preacher, and was for a time attached to the armies of the Emperor Charles V. He spent most of his long career in Germany and Italy, using his formidable intellectual and rhetorical prowess against the spread of Protestantism. He sometimes displeased Ignatius, as when he too strenuously opposed the efforts of Charles V to make peace with the Protestants and was for this reason forced to leave Germany.

He died at Loreto, Italy, in 1590.

References

External links
 

1511 births
1590 deaths
People from Palencia
University of Paris alumni
16th-century Spanish Jesuits
Spanish expatriates in France
16th-century Spanish Roman Catholic theologians